Mr. Washington Goes to Town is a 1942 American comedy film co-directed by William Beaudine and Jed Buell, and starring F. E. Miller, Mantan Moreland and Maceo Bruce Sheffield. Aimed primarily at black audiences, the film was written and shot in six days.

The same year, the sequel Lucky Ghost was produced and released.

Plot
While serving time in county prison, Wallingford sees a story in the newspaper that his cellmate Schenectady has inherited a mansion from his recently deceased uncle. Hearing this, Schenectady dreams of luxury.

Cast
 F. E. Miller as Wallingford 
 Mantan Moreland as Schenectady Jones 
 Maceo Bruce Sheffield as Brutus Blake 
 Marguerite Whitten as Lady Queenie 
 Edward Boyd as Lonesome Ranger 
 DeForest Covan as Short Man  
 Nathan Curry as Policeman  
 Cleo Desmond as Old Maid  
 Slick Garrison as Man in Barber Chair  
 Clarence Hargrave as Man with Gorilla  
 Henry Hastings as Uncle Utica  
 Charles Hawkins as Goldberg  
 Monte Hawley as Stiletto  
 John Lester Johnson as Tall Man  
 Walter Knox as Man on Crutches  
 Vernon McCalla as Invisible man  
 Clarence Moorehouse as Gorilla 
 Florence O'Brien as Chambermaid  
 Arthur Ray as Blackstone  
 Zerita Stepteau as Mrs. Brutus  
 Johnnie Taylor as Magician  
 Sam Warren as Barber  
 Geraldine Whitfield as Young Girl

References

Bibliography
 Marshall, Wendy L. William Beaudine: From Silents to Television. Scarecrow Press, 2005.

External links
 
 
 
 

1942 films
1942 comedy films
American comedy films
Films directed by William Beaudine
American black-and-white films
1940s English-language films
1940s American films